Dmytro Haponchuk (born 8 November 1995) is a Ukrainian football defender.

Haponchuk is a product of different youth team system, but began from FC Prykarpattya Ivano-Frankivsk. His first trainer was Viktor Poptanych.

Made his debut for FC Metalurh in the match against FC Zorya Luhansk on 7 November 2015 in the Ukrainian Premier League.

References

External links
 
 

1995 births
Living people
Ukrainian footballers
FC Karpaty Yaremche players
FC Metalurh Zaporizhzhia players
FC Prykarpattia Ivano-Frankivsk (1998) players
FC Nyva Ternopil players
NK Veres Rivne players
Ukrainian Premier League players
Ukrainian Second League players
Sportspeople from Ivano-Frankivsk
Association football defenders